Arvonen is a Finnish surname. Notable people with the surname include:

 Aarne Arvonen (1897–2009), Finnish supercentenarian
 Pasi Arvonen (born 1968), Finnish ice hockey coach

See also
 Aronen

Finnish-language surnames